Nawar is an Arabic term for several nomad communities used primarily in Jordan, Syria, Lebanon, Israel, and Palestine. The term, regarded as derogatory, is used by Arabs for several diverse ethnic groups. They have historically been called "Gypsies", though as a whole they only have economic activities and lifestyle in connection with the Romani. The Dom people are especially known as Nawar.

This numerically small, widely dispersed people have migrated to the region from South Asia, particularly from India. As in other countries, they tend to keep apart from the rest of the population, which regards them as dishonorable yet clever. The Nawar have traditionally provided musical entertainment at weddings and celebrations. The participation of Nawar women in such activities is lucrative, yet at the same time it reinforces the group's low status. Nawar also appear at festivals to work their trade as fortune-tellers, sorcerers, and animal trainers. In Syria today, one may still encounter Nawar encampments in rural areas.

Population
Nawar is an Arabic term for several sedentary communities used primarily in Syria, Lebanon, and Palestine.

Syria

The Nawar in Syria number 100,000 to 250,000 people according to estimations. The vast majority is sedentary.

Palestine
The Nawar in Palestine are also  known as Ghajars (gypsies)
. A small community in east Jerusalem  lives in Bab Huta neighborhood, in the Old City of Jerusalem.

Jordan
Jordan's Dom community numbers around 70,000 according to estimates in 2015.

Languages

Domari

The Dom language (Domari) in the Middle East is known as Nawari. Domari shows Turkic, Kurdish and Arabic influence.

Notable people
 Bilal

See also
Ghorbati, community in Iran and Afghanistan

Notes

References

Dupret, Ghazzal, Courbage and Al Dbiyat, Collective 'La Syrie au présent : Reflets d'une société', entry "Musiques nawar entre tradition et modernité" by Benoit Gazzal, 2007, 
 Commins, David Dean. Historical Dictionary of Syria, p. 118. Scarecrow Press, 2004, .

 
Dom people
Dom in the Middle East
Nomads
Ethnic groups in the Middle East